Hossein Soudipour (21 March 1922 – 13 September 2017) was a medical doctor and former basketball player and head coach of Iran's national basketball team. He was the former director of Iran's ministry of health before the Islamic revolution.

Early life
Soudipour was born in Tehran, Iran. His original name was not Soudipour he had to change his name due to Iranian politics . His original name was Kahn baba.

Basketball career
Hossein was a part of Iran's national basketball team at the 1948 Summer Olympics in London, the first time that Iran's team qualified for the competition. He was also a member of the team when they won the bronze medal in the 1951 Asian Games in New Delhi. He was chosen personally by the late Shah Mohammad Reza Pahlavi  to be on the team . The shah loved watching him play specially his sky hooks . His team still the only Iranian national basketball team that has won any games in the olympics . His favorite player of all times was Bob Cousy . He was the head coach of the Iranian national basketball team from 1966 until 1968.

References

External links
  www.starball.ir

1922 births
2017 deaths
Iranian men's basketball players
Olympic basketball players of Iran
Basketball players at the 1948 Summer Olympics
Asian Games bronze medalists for Iran
People from Tehran
Asian Games medalists in basketball
Basketball players at the 1951 Asian Games
Medalists at the 1951 Asian Games